Apti Eziev (born 21 July 1989 in Russia) is a fashion designer based in Belarus.

Participated in fashion shows:

References 

1989 births
Living people
Belarusian fashion designers